The Argentine Yachting Federation is the national governing body for the sport of sailing in Argentina, recognised by the International Sailing Federation.

History
The Federation was formed in 1928 with the name Yacht Racing National Union, changing name to Yacht Racing Argentinian Federation in 1934 and finally to Argentine Yachting Federation in 1970.

The national governing body for the sport of sailing in Argentina was previously the Argentine Yacht Club. The Argentine Yachting Federation took over the function in 1998.

Since 1966, the Federation had been organizing the annual Yachting Day in Mar del Plata.

Description
The Argentine Yachting Federeation is affiliated with World Sailing.

Famous sailors
See :Category:Argentine sailors

Olympic sailing
See :Category:Olympic sailors of Argentina

Offshore sailing
See :Category:Argentine sailors (sport)

References

External links
 Official website
 ISAF MNA Microsite

Argentina
Yachting
Yachting associations
Sailing governing bodies
1902 establishments in Argentina